The 1912 Detroit Tigers football team  was an American football team that represented the University of Detroit in the 1912 college football season. In its second season under head coach Royal R. Campbell, the team compiled a 5–2–1 record and outscored its opponents by a combined total of 242 to 104.

Schedule

Notes

References

Detroit
Detroit Titans football seasons
Detroit Tigers football
Detroit Tigers football